The Chief Whip of the Labour Party oversees the whipping system in the party, which is responsible for ensuring that Labour MPs or members of the House of Lords attend and vote in parliament in the desired way of the party leadership. Chief Whips, of which two are appointed in the party, a member of the House of Commons and a member of the House of Lords, also help to organise their party's contribution to parliamentary business. The Chief Whip manages a team of whips, who they may appoint from the Parliamentary Labour Party, to support the work of the whips’ office. 

The party leadership may allow members to have a free vote, based on their own decision, rather than party policy, which means the chief whip is not required to influence the way members vote.

The role of Chief Whip is regarded as secretive, as the Whip is concerned with the discipline of their own party's Members of Parliament.

By convention, Chief Whips do not sign early day motions or table questions to Ministers. Nor do they give media interviews in their capacity as whip. 

This is a list of those people who have served as Chief Whip of the Labour Party in the Parliament of the United Kingdom.

House of Commons

Current Deputy Chief Whip 

Lilian Greenwood

House of Lords

Deputy Chief Whip

See also
 Chief Whip of the Conservative Party
 Chief Whip of the Liberal Democrats

References

 Chris Cook and Brendan Keith, British Historical Facts 1830-1900, Macmillan, 1975
 David Butler and Gareth Butler, Twentieth-Century British Historical Facts 1900-2000, Macmillan, 2000

 
Organisation of the Labour Party (UK)
Political whips